Smith Island or Smith's Island may refer to the following places:

Antarctica
Smith Islands, Wilkes Land 
Smith Island (South Shetland Islands)

Australia
Smith Islands National Park, Queensland
Smith Island (South Australia)

Bermuda
Smith's Island, Bermuda

Canada
Smith Island (British Columbia), off the mouth of the Skeena River
Smith Island (Frobisher Bay, Nunavut)
Smith Island (Hudson Bay, Nunavut)
Smith Island (Ontario), an island in Ontario

India
Smith Island (Andaman and Nicobar Islands)

Japan
Smith Island (Japan)

United States
Smith Island (California)
Smith Island (Connecticut), in the Thimble Islands
Smith Island (Illinois), in Kankakee River State Park, Illinois
Smith Island, Maryland
Smith Island (North Carolina), now known as Bald Head Island
Smith Island, Virginia
Smith Island (Washington)
Smith Island Light
Smith's Island Recreation Area, Pleasant Valley Township, Scott County, Iowa

See also

 Smith's Island (disambiguation)
 Smith Island cake, a region-specific traditional cuisine of Smith Island, Maryland, U.S.
 Smith Island cottontail, a probably extinct rabbit subspecies